Microcacia is a genus of longhorn beetles of the subfamily Lamiinae, containing the following species:

 Microcacia albosignata Breuning, 1968
 Microcacia longiscapa Breuning, 1939

References

Mesosini